The R346 is a Regional Route in Eastern Cape, South Africa that connects Kidd's Beach with Stutterheim via King William’s Town.

Route 
Its northern terminus is a junction with the N6 at Stutterheim. It heads south-south-west through Braunschweig to King William's Town where it crosses the N2 and the R63 at a staggered junction. It leaves the town heading south-south-east through Zwelitsha, where it crosses the Buffalo River. It heads south, then east, then south again, to reach its end at a junction with the R72 just north-west of Kidd's Beach.

External links
 Routes Travel Info

References

Regional Routes in the Eastern Cape